Quinoa (Chenopodium quinoa; , from Quechua  or ) is a flowering plant in the amaranth family. It is a herbaceous annual plant grown as a crop primarily for its edible seeds; the seeds are rich in protein, dietary fiber, B vitamins and dietary minerals in amounts greater than in many grains. Quinoa is not a grass but rather a pseudocereal botanically related to spinach and amaranth (Amaranthus spp.), and originated in the Andean region of northwestern South America. It was first used to feed livestock 5,2007,000 years ago, and for human consumption 3,0004,000 years ago in the Lake Titicaca basin of Peru and Bolivia.

The plant thrives at high altitudes and produces seeds that are rich in protein. Almost all production in the Andean region is done by small farms and associations. Its cultivation has spread to more than 70 countries, including Kenya, India, the United States and European countries. As a result of increased popularity and consumption in North America, Europe, and Australasia, quinoa crop prices tripled between 2006 and 2014.

Etymology and nomenclature
The species Chenopodium quinoa was first described by Carl Ludwig Willdenow (17651812), a German botanist who studied plants from South America, brought back by explorers Alexander von Humboldt and Aimé Bonpland.

The genus name Chenopodium is composed of two words coming from the Greek χήν,-νός, goose and πόδῖον, podion "little foot", or "goose foot", because of the resemblance of the leaves with the trace of a crow's foot.

The specific epithet quinoa is a borrowing from the Spanish quinua or quinoa, itself derived from Quechua kinwa.

The Incas nicknamed quinoa chisiya mama, which in Quechua means "mother of all grains".

Botany

Description 
It has broad, generally powdery, hairy, lobed leaves, normally arranged alternately. The woody central stem is branched or unbranched depending on the variety and may be green, red or purple. The flowering panicles arise from the top of the plant or from leaf axils along the stem. Each panicle has a central axis from which a secondary axis emerges either with flowers (amaranthiform) or bearing a tertiary axis carrying the flowers (glomeruliform). These are small, incomplete, sessile flowers of the same colour as the sepals, and both pistillate and perfect forms occur. Pistillate flowers are generally located at the proximal end of the glomeruli and the perfect ones at the distal end of it. A perfect flower has five sepals, five anthers and a superior ovary, from which two to three stigmatic branches emerge.

The green hypogynous flowers have a simple perianth and are generally self-fertilizing, though cross-pollination occurs. In the natural environment, betalains serve to attract animals to generate a greater rate of pollination and ensure, or improve, seed dissemination.

In regards to the "newly" developed salinity resistance of C.quinoa, some studies have concluded that accumulation of organic osmolytes plays a dual role for the species. They provide osmotic adjustment, in addition to protection against oxidative stress of the photosynthetic structures in developing leaves. Studies also suggested that reduction in stomatal density in reaction to salinity levels represents an essential instrument of defence to optimize water use efficiency under the given conditions to which it may be exposed.

Natural distribution
Chenopodium quinoa is believed to have been domesticated in the Peruvian Andes from wild or weed populations of the same species. There are non-cultivated quinoa plants (Chenopodium quinoa var. melanospermum) that grow in the area it is cultivated; these may either be related to wild predecessors, or they could be descendants of cultivated plants.

Nutrition

Raw, uncooked quinoa is 13% water, 64% carbohydrates, 14% protein, and 6% fat. Nutritional evaluations indicate that a  serving of raw quinoa seeds is a rich source (20% or higher of the Daily Value, DV) of protein, dietary fiber, several B vitamins, including 46%DV for folate, and the dietary minerals magnesium, phosphorus, and manganese (table).

After boiling, which is the typical preparation for eating the seeds, quinoa is 72% water, 21% carbohydrates, 4% protein, and 2% fat. In a  serving, cooked quinoa provides  of food energy and is a rich source of manganese and phosphorus (30% and 22%DV, respectively), and a moderate source (10–19%DV) of dietary fiber, folate, and the dietary minerals iron, zinc, and magnesium (table).

Quinoa is gluten-free. Because of the high concentration of protein, ease of use, versatility in preparation, and potential for increased yields in controlled environments,. Quinoa is also a good source of many nutrients including zinc, magnesium, folate & iron. It has been selected as an experimental crop in NASA's Controlled Ecological Life Support System for long-duration human occupied space flights.

Saponins and oxalic acid
In their natural state, the seeds have a coating that contains bitter-tasting saponins, making them unpalatable. Most of the grain sold commercially has been processed to remove this coating. This bitterness has beneficial effects during cultivation, as it deters birds and, therefore, the plant requires minimal protection. The genetic control of bitterness involves quantitative inheritance. Although lowering the saponin content through selective breeding to produce sweeter, more palatable varieties is complicated by ≈10% cross-pollination, it is a major goal of quinoa breeding programs, which may include genetic engineering.

The toxicity category rating of the saponins in quinoa treats them as mild eye and respiratory irritants and as a low gastrointestinal irritant. In South America, these saponins have many uses, including as a detergent for clothing and washing, and as a folk medicine antiseptic for skin injuries.

Additionally, the leaves and stems of all species of the genus Chenopodium and related genera of the family Amaranthaceae, including quinoa, contain high levels of oxalic acid.

Cultivation

Climate requirements
The plant's growth is highly variable due to the number of different subspecies, varieties and landraces (domesticated plants or animals adapted to the environment in which they originated). Depending on the variety, optimal growing conditions are in cool climates with temperatures that vary between  during the night to near  during the day. Some cultivars can withstand lower temperatures without damage. Light frosts normally do not affect the plants at any stage of development, except during flowering. Midsummer frosts during flowering, a frequent occurrence in the Andes, lead to sterilization of the pollen. Rainfall requirements are highly variable between the different cultivars, ranging from  during the growing season. Growth is optimal with well-distributed rainfall during early growth and no rain during seed maturation and harvesting.

United States 
Quinoa has been cultivated in the United States, primarily in the high elevation San Luis Valley of Colorado where it was introduced in 1983. In the 2010s, experimental production was attempted in the Palouse region of Eastern Washington, and farmers in Western Washington began producing the crop. The Washington State University Skagit River Valley research facility near Mount Vernon grew thousands of its own experimental varieties. The Puget Sound region's climate is similar to that of coastal Chile where the crop has been grown for centuries. Due to the short growing season, North American cultivation requires short-maturity varieties, typically of Bolivian origin. Quinoa is planted in Idaho where a variety developed and bred specifically for the high-altitude Snake River Plain is the largest planted variety in North America.

Europe 
Several countries within Europe have successfully grown quinoa on a commercial scale.

Sowing
Quinoa plants do best in sandy, well-drained soils with a low nutrient content, moderate salinity, and a soil pH of 6 to8.5. The seedbed must be well prepared and drained to avoid waterlogging.

Soil
Quinoa has gained attention for its adaptability to contrasting environments such as saline soils, nutrient-poor soils and drought stressed marginal agroecosystems. Yields are maximised when  of nitrogen is available. The addition of phosphorus does not improve yield.

Pests
In eastern North America, it is susceptible to a leaf miner that may reduce crop success. (The miner also affects the common weed and close relative Chenopodium album, but C.album is much more resistant.)

Rotation is used in its Andean native range. Rotation is common with potato, cereals and legumes including Lupinus mutabilis.

Genetics
The genome of quinoa was sequenced in 2017. Through traditional selective breeding and, potentially, genetic engineering, the plant is being modified to have higher crop yield, improved tolerance to heat and biotic stress, and greater sweetness through saponin inhibition.

Harvesting
Traditionally, quinoa grain is harvested by hand, and only rarely by machine, because the extreme variability of the maturity period of most quinoa cultivars complicates mechanization. Harvest needs to be precisely timed to avoid high seed losses from shattering, and different panicles on the same plant mature at different times. The crop yield in the Andean region (often around 3 t/ha up to 5 t/ha) is comparable to wheat yields. In the United States, varieties have been selected for uniformity of maturity and are mechanically harvested using conventional small grain combines.

Processing 
The plants are allowed to stand until the stalks and seeds have dried out and the grain has reached a moisture content below 10%.
Handling involves threshing the seedheads from the chaff and winnowing the seed to remove the husk. Before storage, the seeds need to be dried in order to avoid germination. Dry seeds can be stored raw, until being washed or mechanically processed to remove the pericarp to eliminate the bitter layer containing saponins. This was traditionally done manually, which is labour-intensive. The seeds must be dried again before being stored and sold in stores.

Production

In 2020, world production of quinoa was 175,188 tonnes, led by Peru and Bolivia with 97% of the total when combined (table).

Price
Since the early 21st century when quinoa became more commonly consumed in North America, Europe, and Australasia where it was not typically grown, the crop value increased. Between 2006 and 2013, quinoa crop prices tripled. In 2011, the average price was US $3,115 per tonne with some varieties selling as high as $8,000 per tonne. This compares with wheat prices of about US $340 per tonne, making wheat about 10% of the value of quinoa. The resulting effect on traditional production regions in Peru and Bolivia also influenced new commercial quinoa production elsewhere in the world, such as the United States. By 2013, quinoa was being cultivated in some 70 countries. As a result of expanding production outside the Andean highlands native for quinoa, the price plummeted starting in early 2015 and remained low for years. From 2018 to 2019, quinoa production in Peru declined by 22%. Some refer to this as the "quinoa bust" because of the devastation the price fall caused for farmers and industry.

Effects of rising demand on growers

Rising quinoa prices over the period of 2006 to 2017 may have reduced the affordability of quinoa to traditional consumers. However, a 2016 study using Peru's Encuesta Nacional de Hogares found that rising quinoa prices during 2004–2013 led to net economic benefits for producers, and other commentary indicated similar conclusions, including for women specifically. Impacts of the price surge on quinoa consumption in the Andes mainly affected urban poor rather than farmers themselves, and these impacts were reduced when the price fell in 2015. It has also been suggested that as quinoa producers rise above subsistence-level income, they switch their own consumption to Western processed foods which are often less healthy than a traditional, quinoa-based diet, whether because quinoa is held to be worth too much to keep for oneself and one's family, or because processed foods have higher status despite their poorer nutritional value. Efforts are being made in some areas to distribute quinoa more widely and ensure that farming and poorer populations have access to it and have an understanding of its nutritional importance, including use in free school breakfasts and government provisions distributed to pregnant and nursing women in need.

In terms of wider social consequences, research on traditional producers in Bolivia has emphasised a complex picture. The degree to which individual producers benefit from the global quinoa boom depends on its mode of production, for example through producer associations and co-operatives such as the Asociación Nacional de Productores de Quinua (founded in the 1970s), contracting through vertically-integrated private firms, or wage labor. State regulation and enforcement may promote a shift to cash-cropping among some farmers and a shift toward subsistence production among others, while enabling many urban refugees to return to working the land, outcomes with complex and varied social effects.

The growth of quinoa consumption outside of its indigenous region has raised concerns over food security of the original consumers, unsustainably intensive farming of the crop, expansion of farming into otherwise marginal agricultural lands with concurrent loss of the natural environment, threatening both the sustainability of producer agriculture and the biodiversity of quinoa.

World demand for quinoa is sometimes presented in the media particularly as being caused by rising veganism, but one academic has commented that despite the drawbacks of quinoa, meat production in most cases is still less sustainable than quinoa.

Culture

United Nations recognition

The United Nations General Assembly declared 2013 as the "", in recognition of the ancestral practices of the Andean people, who have preserved it as a food for present and future generations, through knowledge and practices of living in harmony with nature. The objective was to draw the world’s attention to the role that quinoa could play in providing food security, nutrition and poverty eradication in support of achieving Millennium Development Goals. Some academic commentary emphasized that quinoa production could have ecological and social drawbacks in its native regions, and that these problems needed to be tackled.

Kosher certification
Quinoa is used in the Jewish community as a substitute for the leavened grains that are forbidden during the Passover holiday. Several kosher certification organizations refuse to certify it as being kosher for Passover, citing reasons including its resemblance to prohibited grains or fear of cross-contamination of the product from nearby fields of prohibited grain or during packaging. However, in December 2013 the Orthodox Union, the world's largest kosher certification agency, announced it would begin certifying quinoa as kosher for Passover.

History 

Quinoa is an allotetraploid plant, containing two full sets of chromosomes from two different species which hybridised with each other at one time. According to a 1979 study, its presumed ancestor is either Chenopodium berlandieri, from North America, or the Andean species Ch. hircinum, although more recent studies, in 2011, even suggest Old World relatives. On the other hand, morphological features relate Ch.quinoa of the Andes and Ch. nuttalliae of Mexico. Some studies have suggested that both species may have been derived from the same wild type. A weedy quinoa, Ch.quinoa var. melanospermum, is known from South America, but no equivalent closely related to Ch.nutalliae has been reported from Mexico so far.

Studies regarding the genetic diversity of quinoa suggest that it may have passed through at least three bottleneck genetic events, with a possible fourth expected:
The first occurred when the species was created, as its two diploid ancestors underwent a hybridization followed by chromosome doubling, this new species was genetically isolated from its parent species, and thus lost a great deal of genetic diversity. These ancestors are still not known, but are not the higher altitude crop species Chenopodium pallidicaule (cañahua), a diploid.
A second bottleneck may have occurred when quinoa was domesticated from its unknown but possible wild tetraploid form. It might have been domesticated twice: once in the high Andes and a second time in the Chilean and Argentinean lowlands.
A third bottleneck can be considered "political", and has lasted more than 400 years, from the Spanish conquest of the new continent until the present time. During this phase quinoa has been replaced with maize, marginalized from production processes possibly due to its important medicinal, social and religious roles for the indigenous populations of South America, but also because it is very difficult to process (dehusk) compared with maize.
In the 21st century, a fourth bottleneck event may occur, as traditional farmers migrate from rural zones to urban centers, which exposes quinoa to the risk of further genetic erosion. Better breeding may also result in loss of genetic diversity, as breeders would be expected to reduce unwanted alleles to produce uniform cultivars, but cross-breeding between local landraces has and will likely produce high-diversity cultivars.

Over the last 5,000years the biogeography of Ch. quinoa has changed greatly, mainly by human influence, convenience and preference. It has changed not only in the area of distribution, but also in regards to the climate this plant was originally adapted to, in contrast to the climates on which it is able to do successfully grow in now. In a process started by a number of pre-Inca South American indigenous cultures, people in Chile have been adapting quinoa to salinity and other forms of stress over the last 3,000years. Quinoa is also cultivated, since an early date, near the coast of northern Chile, where was grown by the Chinchorro culture. Ch. quinoa was brought to the lowlands of south-central Chile at an early date from the Andean highlands. Varieties in the lowlands of south-central Chile derive directly from ancestral cultivars which then evolved in parallel to those of the highlands. It has been suggested that the introduction of Ch. quinoa occurred before highland varieties with floury perisperm emerged. There are wide discrepancies in the suggested dates of introduction, one study suggest c. 1000 BC as introduction date while another 600–1100 AD. In colonial times the plant is known to have been cultivated as far south as Chiloé Archipelago and the shores of Nahuel Huapi Lake. The cuisine of Chiloé included bread made of Quinoa until at least the mid-19th century.

In Chile it had almost disappeared by the early 1940s; as of 2015 the crop is mostly grown in three areas by only some 300 smallholder farmers. Each of these areas is different: indigenous small-scale growers near the border with Bolivia who grow many types of Bolivian forms using the Inca ayllu clan system, a few farmers in the central region who exclusively grow a white-seeded variety and generally market their crops through a well-known cooperative, and in the south by women in home gardens in Mapuche reserves.

When Amaranthaceae became abundant in Lake Pacucha, Peru, the lake was fresh, and the lack of Amaranthaceae taxa strongly indicates droughts which turned the lake into a saltmarsh. Based on the pollen associated with soil manipulation, this is an area of the Andes where domestication of C.quinoa became popular, although it was not the only one. It was domesticated in various geographical zones. With this, morphological adaptations began to happen until having five ecotypes today. Quinoa's genetic diversity illustrates that it was and is a vital crop.

Andean agronomists and nutrition scientists began researching quinoa in the early twentieth century, and it became the subject of much interest among researchers involved in neglected and underutilized crop studies in the 1970s. The grain, however, has received much less attention than crops like maize or wheat.

Particularly for the high variety of Chilean landraces, in addition to how the plant has adapted to different latitudes, this crop is now potentially cultivable almost anywhere in the world.

Gallery

See also
List of cereals
2010s in food
Kiwicha
Chia

Notes

References

Further reading

Bibliography

Chenopodium
Crops originating from indigenous Americans
Crops originating from Ecuador
Crops originating from Peru
Pseudocereals
Flora of South America
Leaf vegetables
Quechua words and phrases
Staple foods
Tropical agriculture
2010s in food